Union Station, also known as Davis Garage, is a historic train station located at Winston-Salem, Forsyth County, North Carolina.  It was designed by Fellhimer & Wagner and built between 1924 and 1926. It is a one- to three-story, banked Beaux-Arts style steel frame building faced with brick and limestone. It consists of a rectangular main body, five bays wide and eight bays deep, with a large square east wing.  The front facade features a limestone portico supported by paired heroic columns with stylized Corinthian order capitals. Surrounding the building are some surviving original landscape features. The station served as the city's sole passenger train station between 1926 and 1970.

It was listed on the National Register of Historic Places in 1998.

References

Railway stations on the National Register of Historic Places in North Carolina
Beaux-Arts architecture in North Carolina
Railway stations in the United States opened in 1926
Buildings and structures in Winston-Salem, North Carolina
National Register of Historic Places in Winston-Salem, North Carolina
Stations along Southern Railway lines in the United States
Norfolk and Western Railway stations
Former railway stations in North Carolina